is a Japanese professional footballer who plays as an attacking midfielder for Portuguese Primeira Liga club Boavista, on loan from Tokushima Vortis.

Career
Watai was born in Shizuoka Prefecture on 18 July 1999. After graduating from Shizuoka Gakuen High School, he joined J2 League club Tokushima Vortis in 2018. On 6 June, he debuted against Tochigi SC in Emperor's Cup.

Watai was loaned to Portuguese club, Boavista for the 2022–23 season.

Career statistics

References

External links
 

1999 births
Living people
Japanese footballers
Association football people from Shizuoka Prefecture
Association football midfielders
J1 League players
J2 League players
Primeira Liga players
Tokushima Vortis players
Boavista F.C. players
Japanese expatriate footballers
Japanese expatriate sportspeople in Portugal
Expatriate footballers in Portugal